is a Japanese football player.

Playing career
Iwai was born in Ehime Prefecture on October 11, 2000. He joined J2 League club Ehime FC from youth team in 2018.

References

External links

2000 births
Living people
Association football people from Ehime Prefecture
Japanese footballers
J2 League players
Ehime FC players
Association football midfielders